Mouhamadou Seye (born 10 October 1988 in Dakar) is a naturalized Slovak football striker who currently plays for Lombard-Pápa TFC. He previously played for Al-Markhiya, Lombard-Pápa TFC and Panetolikos F.C.

Mouhamadou (called Mustafa) came on Slovakia when he was sixteen. His arrival was dramatic. Football scout had left Mouhamadou on the hotel's room and he was alone in foreign country. When his residence permit expired, Seye decided to leave Slovakia. On the Slovak-Austrian border they caught him and he was placed to refugee camp in Brezová pod Bradlom. His football talent was so good, that he began playing for local club. Seye moved to MFK Dubnica in July 2007 where he signed first professional contract. In September 2008, he obtained Slovak nationality and he may play for Slovakia since 2011.

On 2 August 2011 he signed a 3-year contract with Greek club Panetolikos  However, his contract was terminated on January 13, 2012, after only 2 league appearances.

References

External links
 

Living people
1988 births
Footballers from Dakar
Naturalized citizens of Slovakia
Senegalese footballers
Slovak footballers
Association football forwards
FK ŠVS Bradlan Brezová pod Bradlom players
FK Dubnica players
FK Dukla Banská Bystrica players
Slovak Super Liga players
Panetolikos F.C. players
Super League Greece players
Lombard-Pápa TFC footballers
Zalaegerszegi TE players
Nemzeti Bajnokság I players
Nemzeti Bajnokság II players
Senegalese expatriate footballers
Expatriate footballers in Greece
Expatriate footballers in Hungary
Expatriate footballers in Slovakia
Expatriate footballers in Qatar
Senegalese expatriate sportspeople in Slovakia
Senegalese expatriate sportspeople in Greece
Senegalese expatriate sportspeople in Hungary
Senegalese expatriate sportspeople in Qatar
Slovak expatriate sportspeople in Greece
Slovak expatriate sportspeople in Hungary
Slovak expatriate sportspeople in Qatar
Naturalised association football players